weXSTOK is an online portal in India, based out of Mumbai, with a dynamic pricing business model for the B2B Textile marketplaces. The platform facilitates buying and selling of ready and excess goods in the textile industry, via its e-commerce mobile-first interface.

History
XSTOK was founded by Sanjiv Khandelwal and Mihir Shah. Prior to XSTOK, Khandelwal has worked in the B2B and e-auction segments whereas Shah formerly worked with Intel and Bank of America Merrill Lynch. Providing the buyers and sellers with a marketplace for curated, hard-to-find and surplus stocks of fabrics, home textiles, apparels and yarns, at transparent prices, direct from the mills, at a click of a button, is the main concept behind the business.

XSTOK was launched in 2015 as a mobile dynamic pricing marketplace, which received six hundred registrations overnight with its inception. This was first of its kind online auction based platform for the textile market. The business was conceived with the idea of making the textile trade more digitalized and making the mobile trade possible, for all size of businesses. It does not sell any products directly, but instead allows third party sellers to sell their products for an initial registration fee and a transaction fee on each successful transaction. Brands including Arvind Mills, Bombay Dyeing, Welspun, Donear, Grasim, Nahar Industries, Banswara, Trident, Mafatlal, BVM Sintex and Indo Count, to name a few, have associated themselves with XSTOK. According to a news article in The Economic Times, within six months of its launch, over 5,000 buyers had registered on the portal and over 150 suppliers had their textile products listed on this portal. The company later reported to have queries from East African countries and gained attention with its first round of funding from a group of marquis investors. The business also has a web presence, but the founders promoted the company primarily as a specialized mobile-first marketplace, with their apps for Android and iOS.

Funding
The company received 3 crore in seed funding to expand its market. The seed round was backed by investors, including Private Angel Investors, Anupam Mittal, Jeetu Panjabi, Manish Chokshi, Vineet Suchanti, Oliphans Capital and a group of professionals heading consulting, stock broking and logistics companies.

References

External links 
Official website

E-commerce in India
Privately held companies of India